Lotek may refers to:
 Wayne "Lotek" Bennett
 Lotek (food)